L'Amant double (released in the United States as Double Lover) is a 2017 erotic thriller drama film written and directed by François Ozon, based on the 1987 novel Lives of the Twins (also known as Kindred Passions) by Joyce Carol Oates. It stars Marine Vacth as a young woman named Chloé who discovers that her lover is concealing a part of his identity.

Plot
Chloé, a dowdy museum attendant suffering depression and abdominal pain, consults a gynaecologist. She is told that no physical cause can be found and what she needs is a psychiatrist. She consults Paul, under whose sympathetic care she smartens up her appearance and reacts more warmly to people. In fact they have fallen in love, and they move into an apartment together. Unpacking things, she finds that Paul has changed his name and hidden his family details from her.

In the street she sees Paul's double who, she discovers, is a psychiatrist named Louis. Booking a session with him, he is aggressive and she leaves. Next time, he virtually rapes her and after that she returns for more. It emerges that the violent Louis is the estranged twin of the gentle Paul. When Chloé's pain increases dramatically, she is taken to hospital and undergoes surgery. It is found that she was carrying her unborn sister, a parasitic twin, in her womb.

Cast
 Marine Vacth as Chloé
 Jérémie Renier as Paul and Louis 
 Jacqueline Bisset as Mrs. Schenker
 Myriam Boyer as Rose
 Dominique Reymond as Agnès Wexler

Release
The film was selected to compete for the Palme d'Or in the main competition section at the 2017 Cannes Film Festival. It had its world premiere at Cannes on 26 May 2017, with a simultaneous theatrical release in France on the same day.

Critical reception
L'Amant double received generally positive reviews from critics. On review aggregator Rotten Tomatoes, the film holds a 71% approval rating based on 91 reviews, with an average rating of 6.4/10. The website's critics consensus reads, "Double Lover offers kinky pleasures that should thrill fans of classic erotic cinema while adding some uniquely transgressive European twists." On Metacritic, the film has a score of 70 out of 100 from 20 critics, indicating "generally favorable reviews".

Accolades
At the 8th Magritte Awards, the film received a nomination in the category of Best Actor for Renier.

References

External links
 
 
 
 

2017 films
2017 thriller drama films
2010s erotic thriller films
2010s French-language films
Belgian erotic drama films
Belgian erotic thriller films
Belgian thriller drama films
Films about twin brothers
Films based on American novels
Films directed by François Ozon
Films set in Paris
Films shot in Paris
French erotic drama films
French erotic thriller films
French thriller drama films
2010s French films